Jonathan's (Japanese: ジョナサン) is a restaurant chain in Japan. The chain is a family oriented chain that serves both American cuisine and Japanese cuisine. Jonathan's is owned by the Skylark Holdings.

History 
The first restaurant was opened in 1980. The original plan was for it to sell coffee and snacks, but it ended up becoming a family style restaurant. The first restaurant was opened in Nerima, Tokyo. In 1986, they offered an IPO and by 1987, had 100 locations. They opened their 200th location in 1997 and then opened their 300th location in 2000, but currently have around 274 locations. They have over 20 locations in Tokyo, Osaka, Kanagawa, Saitama and Nagano.

Description 
Jonathan's offers dine-in, takeout and home delivery options. The restaurant features breakfast, lunch and dinner items ranging from pizza, wine, pancakes, seafood, beef and parfait.

Jonathan's offers free wi-fi and charging stations. It allows customers to order via touchscreen.

Jonathan's has also banned smoking inside of the restaurant. Some locations of the restaurant are open 24 hours a day.

In popular culture 
The restaurant was featured on TV Tokyo's Dekamori Hunter television show in 2020.

References

Food and drink companies of Japan
Restaurants in Japan
Japanese restaurants
Restaurants established in 1980
Fast-food chains of Japan